Skips are a snack from the United Kingdom and Ireland; which were first launched in 1974 in prawn cocktail flavour.

Skips are similar to Chinese prawn crackers, although they are smaller and have a finer texture that makes them fizz and melt on the tongue.  The snacks are made by KP Snacks under license of the German snack food company Intersnack. In the United Kingdom, they are made with tapioca starch and in Ireland with maize starch. Packets of Skips often have jokes or tongue twisters written on the back, which are aimed at children. Other flavours, such as pickled onion, Caribbean Spice curry (teal blue bag), Hot from Rio chilli (orange bag), Chinese spare rib (purple bag), a limited edition ReBoot Dots Doughnut (pink bag) and a ReBoot pizza flavour,  Sweetcorn Relish (1985, yellow bag and Sweet'n'Sour  have been available in the past. In 2002, KP launched 2 new variations of Skips intended to offer a 'unique taste sensation'. Buzz Boltz featured a 'crunch-melt' experience and Tickle Pickle delivered a 'puff-melt' sensation. Both have since been discontinued.

Since early 2006, Skips have seen a 30% reduction in saturated fat and a 10% reduction in sodium and are made with 100% sunflower oil. Skips contain no artificial colours or flavourings.

In 2012, the brand and KP Snacks was sold by United biscuits to German company Intersnack.

In the Republic of Ireland, Skips are sold under the Tayto brand, which is also owned by Intersnack.

Sponsorship and TV adverts
The children's theme has been extended in previous years with the sponsorship of Dragon's Fury, a popular attraction at Chessington World Of Adventures.

Ex-EastEnders actress Daniela Denby-Ashe, who played Sarah Hills in the show and Janey Harper in My Family, appeared in a Skips advert as a teenager. Also in the 1980s, wrestler Giant Haystacks appeared in a TV advert for Skips, with the closing line "Dainty aren't they?".

Action Biker, a mid-1980s budget computer game from Mastertronic, featured the Clumsy Colin character from the then-current Skips adverts, as well as KP Skips branding on the case artwork.

Actor Craig Charles voiced a series of ads as an anthropomorphic tongue, meant to be the viewer's. The ads aired with the closing line "Stick a Skip on your tongue; it asked for it!"

See also
 List of brand name snack foods

References

Products introduced in 1974
Brand name snack foods
British snack foods
United Biscuits brands